Jonas Fernando Sulzbach (born February 7, 1986) is a Brazilian model. He is known for winning the Mister Brasil Mundo contest and for his participation in the twelfth season of the reality show Big Brother Brazil, where he was in third place.

He has campaigned for brands such as Pioneer, Chevrolet, Vuarnet, Riachuelo, Scala and has also been covered by Men's Health and Runner's magazines.

Biography 
Sulzbach was born in Lajeado, Rio Grande do Sul. He started modeling because of his mother's insistence. In 2004, at the age of 17, he moved to São Paulo to pursue his career, during which time he also worked as a bartender. After some years living in São Paulo, the young model's career began to take off and to succeed.

Career

Mister Brazil 2010

March 4, 2010, Jonas was won the Mister Brazil 2010 contest,

Mister World 2010

On March 27, Jonas finished the competition between the semifinalists of the contest, which was won by the Irishman Kamal Ibrahim.

Big Brother Brazil
On January 4, 2012, Jonas was in twelfth edition of Big Brother Brasil, from Rede Globo, which premiered on January 10. He was in third place, winning a prize of 50 thousand reais and a car he won during the program.

Louco por Elas
After leaving the reality show, recorded a participation in the last episode of the first season of the series Louco por Elas, also on Globo. In the episode in which Jonas participated, he is Charmosão. Sulzbach played with Deborah Secco. The recordings took place at Macumba Beach, in Rio de Janeiro.

Filmography

Television

Early life 
In June 2015 was born his first son, João Lucas, fruit of a relationship of only one night with model Natalia Vieira. He has been dating model Mari Gonzalez since November 2015.

References

External links
 

1986 births
Living people
People from Lajeado
Brazilian people of German descent
Brazilian male models
Big Brother (franchise) contestants
Bartenders
Big Brother Brasil